WHPK (88.5 FM) is an American radio station based in Hyde Park on the South Side of Chicago, established in 1968. The station is owned by the University of Chicago, and operated by volunteer students and community members. WHPK's station manager and program director are elected by the station's student members and must be students themselves. The station's broadcast engineer is paid by the university.

History

In 1968, WHPK-FM was established when the campus secret Society of the Owl and Serpent disbanded, donating its funds and Reynolds Club office space to a student radio group. WHPK-FM started broadcasting as a 15-watt FM station at 88.3 MHz on March 22, 1968. In 1985, WHPK-FM upgraded to a 100-watt transmitter and moved to the current frequency of 88.5 MHz.

WHPK-FM was the first radio station to broadcast hip hop music in Chicago, and would become home to aspiring rappers throughout the years, including Common and Kanye West.

The station changed its call sign to the current WHPK on February 26, 2016.

Content
Programming blocks are divided into classical, folk, international, jazz, public affairs, rap, rock, and specialty show formats.

Notable
In 1984, WHPK-FM's first rap show was established by Ken Wissoker. DJ JP Chill has had a rap and hip hop show on WHPK since 1986.

A long-running Saturday night show, The Blues Excursion, is hosted by a widely received radio personality named Arkansas Red.

Recognition
In 2008, WHPK-FM was awarded "Best College Radio Station" by Chicago Reader.

References

External links
Official website

Radio stations established in 1968
HPK
University of Chicago
HPK
1968 establishments in Illinois